Joseph Walsh (1 May 1943 – 9 November 2014) was an Irish Fianna Fáil politician who served as Minister for Agriculture and Food from 1992 to 1994 and 1997 to 2004. He served as a Teachta Dála (TD) for Cork South-West constituency from 1977 to 1981 and 1982 to 2007. He was a Senator elected by the Cultural and Educational Panel from 1981 to 1982.

Early life
Walsh was born in May 1943 in Ballineen, County Cork. He was educated at St Finbarr's College, Cork and University College Cork, where he qualified with a degree in Dairy Science in 1970. During his time in university he became involved in politics, establishing the first Fianna Fáil cumann in the university. Walsh began his career as a researcher in the National Dairy Research Centre at Moorepark, near Fermoy, before becoming Managing Director of Strand Dairies in Clonakilty, County Cork.

Political career
He began his political career when he was elected a member of Cork County Council in 1974, remaining on the council until the 1991 local elections. He was elected to Dáil Éireann on his first, attempt when he was returned as a Fianna Fáil TD for Cork South-West at the 1977 general election. Walsh lost his seat at the 1981 general election, but secured election by the Cultural and Educational Panel to Seanad Éireann. He was re-elected to the Dáil at the February 1982 general election and retained his seat at every subsequent election until his retirement in 2007.

In the 1980s, Walsh was one of the Gang of 22 who opposed Charles Haughey's leadership of Fianna Fáil. In spite of this, he was appointed Minister of State at the Department of Agriculture and Food when Haughey returned as Taoiseach after the 1987 general election. In 1989, he was a key figure in the negotiations which led to the formation of the historic Fianna Fáil-Progressive Democrats coalition government. He remained as Minister of State until 1992 when Albert Reynolds became Taoiseach. Walsh was appointed to the Cabinet as Minister for Agriculture and Food in February of the same year. He remained in that position until December 1994. In 1997 Fianna Fáil returned to power and Walsh was again appointed Minister for Agriculture and Food in Bertie Ahern's government. 

When Ireland was confronted with a foot-and-mouth disease crisis in 2001, Walsh introduced control measures to prevent a full-scale outbreak, such as curtailing the movement of animals with football games and the postponement of sporting events including 2001 Six Nations Championship.

He received several awards, including the Légion d'honneur and the Grand Cross of the Agricultural Order of Merit of Spain. On 13 August 2004, he announced that he would retire from the Cabinet after spending 14 years of his career at the Department of Agriculture.

He sat on the board of Bank of Ireland, and received an annual Oireachtas pension payments of €119,177.

Death
Walsh died at Cork University Hospital on 9 November 2014, after a "short illness".

References

 

1943 births
2014 deaths
Alumni of University College Cork
Fianna Fáil TDs
Local councillors in County Cork
Members of the 21st Dáil
Members of the 15th Seanad
Members of the 23rd Dáil
Members of the 24th Dáil
Members of the 25th Dáil
Members of the 26th Dáil
Members of the 27th Dáil
Members of the 28th Dáil
Members of the 29th Dáil
Ministers for Agriculture (Ireland)
Ministers of State of the 26th Dáil
Ministers of State of the 25th Dáil
Officiers of the Légion d'honneur
Fianna Fáil senators